John Saka Addo is a Ghanaian economist and statesman who was governor of the Bank of Ghana from 29 March 1983 to 3 June 1987 and a member of the Council of State. He is a co-founder and former managing director of Prudential Bank Limited.

Biography
Addo was born at Korle Gonno to Thomas Kpakpo Addo and Emelia Okaikor Addo (née Mensah of James Town).

He attended Achimota School and then studied economics at the University of Ghana, Legon, and was hired as a probationary officer at the Bank of Ghana in 1958. In 1963, he was appointed secretary to the board of directors. In 1965, he was appointed executive director and was promoted to deputy governor in 1968.

In 1983, he was appointed governor of the Bank of Ghana and served in that capacity until 1987. He is a co-founder of Prudential Bank Limited and was its chairman. In 2005, he was made a member of the Council of State.

After the death of his first wife, Addo married Evelyn Naa Otua Addo (née Bonney), with whom he has one child called Genevieve Naa-Aku Addo.

References

 

Year of birth missing (living people)
Living people
20th-century  Ghanaian economists
Governors of Bank of Ghana
Alumni of Achimota School
University of Ghana alumni
Ga-Adangbe people
20th-century Ghanaian businesspeople
Ghanaian chief executives
Ghanaian civil servants
Ghanaian Protestants
Ghanaian business executives